Visoto village is situated on the south east coast of Ovalau, Fiji. These settlers are the descendant people of Lovoni. The chiefly title or Nai Cavuti Turaga na Vavanua connected to the chiefly family of the Turaga na Tui Wailevu in Lovoni comes from the mataqali na Utori; the ancestor of Waisake Bukavesi; the rightful ownership for the chiefly title or the tutu va vanua.

Lomaiviti Province